The 1926 Maine gubernatorial election took place on September 13, 1926. Incumbent Republican Governor Ralph Owen Brewster defeated Democratic candidate Ernest L. McLean.

Results

References

Gubernatorial
1926
Maine
September 1926 events